Nenem…Chinna Pillana?  is a 2013 Indian Telugu-language film directed by P. Sunil Kumar Reddy and produced by D. Ramanaidu under Suresh Productions. It features Rahul Ravindran and Tanvi Vyas in the lead. The film was initially titled as Pattudhala.

Cast
Rahul Ravindran as Krish
Tanvi Vyas as Swapna
Sanjjanaa Galrani
Sharath Babu
Aamani
Suman
Raghu Babu
L.B. Sriram
Ali
Venu Madhav
Kasi Viswanath
Thagubothu Ramesh
Jaya Prakash Reddy
AVS
D. Ramanaidu (cameo)

Production

Casting
Former Miss India Earth Tanvi Vyas is making her debut in Telugu cinema as a lead actress with this film with Sharath Babu, Suman, Raghubabu, L.B. Sriram, Kasi Viswanath, Thagubothu Ramesh and Jaya Prakash Reddy doing important roles in this film. The film sees Sanjjanaa playing the crucial role of an NRI and D. Ramanaidu in a cameo.

Filming
The film was launched on 13 February 2013 in Hyderabad. The regular shooting of the film began on 1 April 2013 with the first schedule wrapping up in Hyderabad where several scenes and a song were canned on the lead cast. The film has completed a major schedule in Denmark and Sweden, where the hero's introduction scenes, two songs and several important scenes were shot.

Soundtrack

Release and reception 
The film was set to release on 26 September 2013, but had to be postponed to 8 November due to advance release of Attharintiki Daaredhi. The Times of India gave the film a rating of three-and-half out of five stars and stated that "It's that kind of a movie that didn't draw the masses into the theatres when it was released, however, it's worth a watch. Rahul deserves appreciation for portraying his role just perfect".

References 

2010s Telugu-language films
Films shot in Denmark
Films shot in Sweden
Films scored by M. M. Srilekha